Chelev (kheylev or ẖelev), or what is also known as "suet", is the animal fats that the Torah prohibits Jews and Israelites from eating. Only the chelev of animals that are of the sort from which offerings can be brought in the Tabernacle or Temple are prohibited. The prohibition of eating chelev is also, in addition to the Torah, one of the 613 commandments that, according to the Talmud, were given to Moses on Mount Sinai.

Hebrew Bible

Hebrew language
In Biblical Hebrew, the word for fat is chelev (חֵלֶב), and it is first used for the "fats" of Abel's offering, and most often used for fats of animal sacrifices on the altar of the Tabernacle or Temple. The same word is also used in the phrase "the fat of the land."

Rabbinical interpretation
The punishment for eating chelev bemeizid (on purpose) is kareth (exclusion from the after life). The atonement for eating it by mistake is to bring a korban hattath (atonement sacrifice).

The prohibition on chelev is only regarding those animal types which were used as a korban: cattle, sheep and goat, which are the only kosher domestic livestock. Fats from avians and deer may be eaten, and different types of bovinae are in a state of doubt.

Rabbi Abraham Isaac Kook suggested that the prohibition of chelev reminds us that we may only take the lives of domesticated animals for our essential needs. "We are permitted to slaughter these animals for their meat, to give us energy and strength, but … we should not kill them merely for the pleasure of eating their fatty meat, so pleasurable to the palate of the gastronome."

In order that fat should be considered chelev it must look like a sheet of fats, like a thick fibrous skin that can be removed (see picture). Some tendons and muscles are also removed due to the rabbinic law, since they are neighboring and resolving some chelev.

The chelev must be removed by a qualified menaker in a process called nikkur (surgical removal).

Kidney fats
The fats surrounding the kidneys are called chelev hakloyoth, and are considered non-kosher.

Abdominal fats
The sheet of fat which is covering the interior of the abdominopelvic cavity is real chelev, except at some regions where it is covered with muscle, not with skin or tendon. However even where it is covered with meat, there is some fat which is still forbidden, since it could occasionally get uncovered while the animal walks. Therefore, one must be well trained in order to identify kosher fat.

Digestive system fats 
There are many fats around the digestive organs such as the stomach and intestines, and one must be highly educated and trained in order to identify them.

Tail fat
The tail fat of the fat-tailed sheep, called alyah in Hebrew, is a large fatty membrane located on the hindquarters of certain breeds of sheep. The Torah uses the term chelev of this fat, but only in the sense of "the good part"; its consumption is permitted. The Karaites, however, understand this fat to literally be forbidden chelev, and thus do not allow eating the tail fat. Rabbi Judah HaLevi, in his 12th century work The Kuzari, questioned the practicality of the Karaite position: "Where exactly does [the prohibited fat] end? Some might prohibit only the tip of the sheep tail, while others the entire hind part."

References

External links
Laws of Judaism concerning eating fat from the Torah and Maimonides’ Code of Jewish Law
Getting the Knack of Nikkur: OU Kashrut Seminar on Removing Veins and Forbidden Fat Big Success
OU Film

Jewish sacrificial law
Ancient Israel and Judah
Negative Mitzvoth
Animal anatomy
Hebrew words and phrases in the Hebrew Bible
Hebrew words and phrases in Jewish law
Animal fats
Kashrut